Prairie Township is a township in Kossuth County, Iowa, United States.

History
Prairie Township was organized in 1882. It takes its name from the Prairie Creek.

References

Townships in Kossuth County, Iowa
Townships in Iowa
1882 establishments in Iowa
Populated places established in 1882